Samuel Davis Dalembert (born May 10, 1981) is a Haitian-Canadian former professional basketball player who played 13 seasons in the National Basketball Association (NBA). He played college basketball for Seton Hall University. During his active NBA career, Dalembert was known for his rebounding as well as his shot blocking ability.

High school and college career
Dalembert was born in Port-au-Prince, Haiti and lived there for fourteen years before moving to Montreal, where he attended Lucien-Pagé (High School). He also attended St. Patrick High School in Elizabeth, New Jersey. He then went on to play college basketball at Seton Hall from 1999 to 2001.

Professional career
Dalembert was selected with the 26th overall pick by the Philadelphia 76ers in the 2001 NBA draft. After playing 8 seasons with the 76ers, he was traded to the Sacramento Kings for Andrés Nocioni and Spencer Hawes on June 17, 2010.

On December 26, 2011, he signed a multi-year deal with the Houston Rockets.

On June 27, 2012, Dalembert was traded to the Milwaukee Bucks, along with John Henson, the 14th pick in the 2012 NBA draft, for Jon Brockman, Jon Leuer, Shaun Livingston, and Jeremy Lamb, the 12th pick in the 2012 NBA draft.

On July 19, 2013, Dalembert signed with the Dallas Mavericks.

On June 25, 2014, Dalembert, along with Shane Larkin, Wayne Ellington, José Calderón and two 2014 second-round picks, was traded to the New York Knicks in exchange for Tyson Chandler and Raymond Felton. On January 5, 2015, he was waived by the Knicks.

Dalembert's final NBA game was played on December 27, 2014, in a 129–135 loss to the Sacramento Kings. In his final game, Dalembert recorded 11 points, 4 rebounds and 4 blocks.

On August 6, 2015, Dalembert signed with the Dallas Mavericks, returning to the franchise for a second stint. However, he was later waived by the Mavericks on October 24 prior to the start of the regular season. He appeared in four preseason games for the team, but a left leg injury forced him to miss the final three games of the preseason schedule. On December 17, 2015, he signed with Shanxi Zhongyu of the Chinese Basketball Association. He returned to Shanxi for the 2016–17 season.

National team career
After much anticipation, Dalembert became a Canadian citizen on August 7, 2007, and joined the Canadian national team in hopes of qualifying for the Olympics. He made his national team debut during the 2007 FIBA Americas Championship, leading the tournament with 2.4 blocks per game. He also participated in Canada's pre-Olympic qualifying training camp, taking part in games in both Toronto and Hamilton during the 2008 Jack Donohue International Classic, with wins over both Lebanon and New Zealand. However, Dalembert was later dismissed from the team during the World Olympic Qualifying Tournament due to a rift between him and coach Leo Rautins.

Haiti earthquake
Dalembert decided to travel to Haiti to help with relief efforts following the 2010 Haiti earthquake. He also pledged $100,000 to UNICEF.

He won the 2009–10 J. Walter Kennedy Citizenship Award for his contributions to Haitian people after the earthquake. Since the disaster, Dalembert has continued to be involved in the Haitian recovery.

NBA career statistics

Regular season

|-
| style="text-align:left;"| 
| style="text-align:left;"| Philadelphia
| 34 || 0 || 5.2 || .440 || – || .389 || 2.0 || .1 || .2 || .4 || 1.5
|-
| style="text-align:left;"| 
| style="text-align:left;"| Philadelphia
| 82 || 53 || 26.8 || .541 || .000 || .644 || 7.6 || .3 || .5 || 2.3 || 8.0
|-
| style="text-align:left;"| 
| style="text-align:left;"| Philadelphia
| 72 || 60 || 24.8 || .524 || – || .601 || 7.5 || .5 || .6 || 1.7 || 8.2
|-
| style="text-align:left;"| 
| style="text-align:left;"| Philadelphia
| 66 || 52 || 26.7 || .531 || .000 || .705 || 8.2 || .4 || .5 || 2.4 || 7.3
|-
| style="text-align:left;"| 
| style="text-align:left;"| Philadelphia
| 82 || 82 || 30.9 || .541 || .000 || .746 || 8.9 || .8 || .6 || 1.9 || 10.7
|-
| style="text-align:left;"| 
| style="text-align:left;"| Philadelphia
| 82 || 82 || 33.2 || .513 || .000 || .707 || 10.4 || .5 || .5 || 2.3 || 10.5
|-
| style="text-align:left;"| 
| style="text-align:left;"| Philadelphia
| 82 || 82 || 24.8 || .498 || .000 || .734 || 8.5 || .2 || .4 || 1.8 || 6.4
|-
| style="text-align:left;"| 
| style="text-align:left;"| Philadelphia
| 82 || 80 || 25.9 || .545 || – || .729 || 9.6 || .8 || .5 || 1.8 || 8.1
|-
| style="text-align:left;"| 
| style="text-align:left;"| Sacramento
| 80 || 46 || 24.2 || .473 || .000 || .730 || 8.2 || .8 || .5 || 1.5 || 8.1
|-
| style="text-align:left;"| 
| style="text-align:left;"| Houston
| 65 || 45 || 22.2 || .506 || .000 || .796 || 7.0 || .5 || .6 || 1.7 || 7.5
|-
| style="text-align:left;"| 
| style="text-align:left;"| Milwaukee
| 47 || 23 || 16.3 || .542 || 1.000 || .691 || 5.9 || .4 || .4 || 1.1 || 6.7
|-
| style="text-align:left;"| 
| style="text-align:left;"| Dallas
| 80  || 68 || 20.2 || .568 || .000 || .737 || 6.8 || .5 || .5 || 1.2 || 6.6
|-
| style="text-align:left;"| 
| style="text-align:left;"| New York
| 32 || 21 || 17.0 || .438 || – || .700 || 5.3 || .9 || .4 || 1.3 || 4.0
|- class="sortbottom"
| style="text-align:center;" colspan="2"| Career
| 886 || 694 || 24.4 || .521 || .083 || .706 || 7.8 || .5 || .5 || 1.7 || 7.7

Playoffs

|-
| style="text-align:left;"| 2005
| style="text-align:left;"| Philadelphia
| 5 || 5 || 38.4 || .553 || – || .400 || 12.8 || .4 || .4 || 1.4 || 11.6
|-
| style="text-align:left;"| 2008
| style="text-align:left;"| Philadelphia
| 6 || 6 || 32.2 || .422 || – || .842 || 9.5 || .5 || .3 || 1.7 || 9.0
|-
| style="text-align:left;"| 2009
| style="text-align:left;"| Philadelphia
| 6 || 6 || 22.2 || .615 || – || .750 || 7.8 || .5 || .3 || 1.5 || 5.8
|-
| style="text-align:left;"| 2013
| style="text-align:left;"| Milwaukee
| 1 || 0 || 9.0 || .000 || – || .250 || 3.0 || .0 || 1.0 || .0 || 1.0
|-
| style="text-align:left;"| 2014
| style="text-align:left;"| Dallas
| 7 || 7 || 19.3 || .458 || – || .667 || 8.4 || .0 || .3 || 1.4 || 4.6
|- class="sortbottom"
| style="text-align:center;" colspan="2"| Career
| 25 || 24 || 26.5 || .503 || – || .632 || 9.2 || .3 || .4 || 1.4 || 7.2

See also
 List of National Basketball Association career blocks leaders
 List of Canadians in the National Basketball Association

References

External links

ESPN.com Profile

1981 births
Living people
Basketball players from New Jersey
Black Canadian basketball players
Canadian expatriate basketball people in the United States
Canadian men's basketball players
Canadian sportspeople of Haitian descent
Centers (basketball)
Dallas Mavericks players
Haitian emigrants to Canada
Haitian expatriate basketball people in the United States
Haitian men's basketball players
Haitian Quebecers
Houston Rockets players
Milwaukee Bucks players
National Basketball Association players from Canada
National Basketball Association players from Haiti
Naturalized citizens of Canada
New York Knicks players
Parade High School All-Americans (boys' basketball)
Philadelphia 76ers draft picks
Philadelphia 76ers players
Sacramento Kings players
Seton Hall Pirates men's basketball players
Shanxi Loongs players
Basketball players from Montreal
Sportspeople from Port-au-Prince
The Patrick School alumni